A dead body or corpse is a dead human body.

Dead Body may also refer to:
Dead Body (film), a 2002 short film by Kaz Rahman
"The Dead Body", an episode of R. L. Stine's The Haunting Hour
The Dead Body, two episodes of Swift and Shift Couriers

See also
Dead Body on Broadway, a 1969 German thriller film by Harald Reinl
Dead Body Guy, a pseudonym of Chuck Lamb, a programmer from Columbus, Ohio, who gained fame playing dead people in film and television
My Dead Body, a 2009 pulp-noir/horror novel by American writer Charlie Huston
Cadaver (disambiguation)
Carcass (disambiguation)
Carrion (disambiguation)
Corpse (disambiguation)
Over my dead body (disambiguation)